Lendak (Goral: Ľyndak)is a village and municipality in Kežmarok District in the Prešov Region of north Slovakia. It is inhabited by Gorals

Geography
The municipality lies at an altitude of 749 metres and covers an area of 19.658 km².
It has a population of about 5400 people.

History
In historical records the village was first mentioned in 1288.

References

External links
https://web.archive.org/web/20160801183534/http://lendak.e-obce.sk/

Villages and municipalities in Kežmarok District